Ben Nowland (born May 27, 1980 in Jacksonville, Florida) is a former American football offensive lineman. He played most recently for the Georgia Force of the Arena Football League.

High school years
He attended Allen D. Nease Senior High School in Ponte Vedra, Florida and was a student and a letterman in football, wrestling, and track & field. In football, he was a three-year starter. In wrestling, he won a Regional Championship as a senior. In track&field, he was a Regional Champion in the shot put and the discus.

College
Nowland played collegiately with Auburn. Nowland was a first-team All SEC center in 2002.  He was a top 10 finisher for the Rimington Award which is presented to the Nations best center. Nowland participated in the 2003 Senior Bowl in Mobile, AL. and was awarded with their Sportsmanship Award for the event. Nowland started 35 games in his career at Auburn. Nowland is married to his college girlfriend Hillary, who now works for Auburn.  Nowland was in the Walt Disney film "The Game Plan" starring Dewayne "The Rock" Johnson.

Professional
He entered the National Football League by signing as an undrafted free agent with the San Francisco 49ers in 2003. Waived by the 49ers in August of that year, he was signed to the Washington Redskins' practice squad where he stayed through the 2004 season. In 2003 and 2004 Nowland spent time with the Frankfurt Galaxy in NFL Europa. In 2005, he was signed by the Denver Broncos. He began his AFL career with the Georgia Force in 2005. He joined the Rampage in 2006, but re-signed with the Georgia Force during the 2007 offseason.
Nowland retired from football in 2009 and now works as a sales representative.

References

External links
AFL Player Stats

1980 births
Living people
Players of American football from Jacksonville, Florida
American football offensive linemen
Auburn Tigers football players
Frankfurt Galaxy players
Denver Broncos players
Georgia Force players
Grand Rapids Rampage players